A cryometer is a thermometer used to measure very low temperatures of objects. Ethanol-filled thermometers are used in preference to mercury for meteorological measurements of minimum temperatures and can be used down to −70 °C (-94 °F). The physical limitation of the ability of a thermometer to measure low temperature is the freezing point of the liquid used.

There are many types of devices used as cryometers:
thermocouples: these can be used down to measure about 1 K temperature.
vapour pressure thermometers: these can be used to measure temperatures down to about 0.5K
resistance thermometers: these can be used to measure temperatures at 0.01 K.
melting curve thermometers: these can be used to measure temperatures between about 0.001K and 0.5K
resistance noise thermometers: these can be used to down to about 0.001K
magnetic thermometers: which are used at 0.001 K temperatures.
nuclear-resonance thermometers: these are required to measure very low temperatures such as 0.0000001 K.

References
Oxford dictionary of science, 1999, 4th edition, .

Thermometers